Lentz is a Germanic   surname.

People
Notable people with the surname include:
 Bryan Lentz (born 1964), attorney and former Pennsylvania legislator
 Carl Lentz American pastor, former lead pastor of Hillsong Church NYC
 Daniel Lentz (born 1942), American composer
 Georges Lentz (born 1965),  Luxembourgish/Australian composer
 Hugo Lentz, (1859–1944), Austrian mechanical engineer and inventor
 Jim Lentz (born c. 1955), CEO of Toyota Motor North America
 Matt Lentz (born 1982), American football player
 Michael Lentz (born 1964), German writer and musician
 Michel Lentz (1820–1893),  Luxembourgish poet
 Nic Lentz (born 1989), professional baseball umpire
 Nik Lentz (born 1984), American mixed martial artist
 Owen Lentz (born 1980), American rugby union footballer
 Ruediger Lentz (born 1947), German journalist
 Stanislaw Lentz (1861–1920), Polish painter

Places
Lentz-Carter Merchandise Store, American historic building and general store in Stella, Newton County, Missoury, U.S.
Lentz Center for Asian Culture, Lincoln, Nebraska, U.S., part of University of Nebraska-Lincoln
Lentz Hotel, historical building, first commercial building in Cabarrus County, North Carolina, U.S.
Lentz House (Hotel Sheller), historic hotel in North Manchester, Wabash County, Indiana, U.S.

See also
 Lenz (disambiguation)
 Lintz (disambiguation)

References